Jai Pohlani Mata Temple is a Hindu temple for the deity Pohlani Mata. It is located about 8.1 km away from Dalhousie, Himachal Pradesh, India. It includes a teahouse and great views of the Pir Pinjal range.

References
http://www.lonelyplanet.com/india/around-dalhousie/sights/religious/jai-pohlani-mata-temple#ixzz4BNEH5fL6

Hindu temples in Himachal Pradesh
Buildings and structures in Chamba district